Karahsi (also Romanized as Karahsī, Karehsī, and Korrehsī; also known as Karkeseh, Karrahseh, and Korsī) is a village in Abidar Rural District, in the Central District of Sanandaj County, Kurdistan Province, Iran. At the 2006 census, its population was 386, in 102 families. The village is populated by Kurds.

References 

Towns and villages in Sanandaj County
Kurdish settlements in Kurdistan Province